The M1150 Assault Breacher Vehicle (ABV) is a U.S. military mine- and explosives-clearing vehicle, based on the M1 Abrams chassis, equipped with a mine plow and line charges. Its first large scale use by the US Marines was in the joint  ISAF-Afghan Operation Moshtarak in Southern Afghanistan during the War in Afghanistan in 2010 against the Taliban insurgency.

Design and purpose
These tracked combat vehicles were especially designed to clear pathways for troops and other vehicles through minefields and along roadside bombs and improvised explosive devices.

They are equipped with Linear Demolition Charge System (LDCS): rockets carrying C-4 explosives up to 100–150 yards forward, detonating hidden bombs at a safe distance, so that troops and vehicles can pass through safely.

In the 1990s, the U.S. Army decided it could not afford to continue developing complicated, maintenance-heavy vehicles for this purpose. The Grizzly program was cancelled in 2001, and the prototype developed never made it to the production lines. The Marine Corps however persisted and funded its own development and testing. The main body of the final model of the ABV is built on the General Dynamics chassis that is used for the M1A1 Abrams main battle tank. Pearson Engineering of the UK provided the specially designed plow and the other mine-clearing accessories.

Operational history

On February 11, 2010, two breachers fired explosive line charges in the desert outside Sistani to test Taliban defenses on the eve of Operation Moshtarak when closing off the enemy's escape route.

On February 13, 2010, on the first day of the operation, breachers of the US Marines 2nd Combat Engineer Battalion succeeded in digging and blasting "safety lanes" through the numerous minefields laid by the Taliban around Marjah.

According to a report in December 2009, there were then five ABVs in Afghanistan, and the U.S. Marines were said to have plans to field a total of 52 by 2012, of which about 34 have already had been produced. The U.S. Army was said to have ordered 187.

By August 2013, six ABVs were brought to the Korean Peninsula to be used by the 2nd Infantry Division (2ID) to provide the capability for deliberate and in-stride breaching of mine fields and complex obstacles. The ABVs would allow the 2ID to clear the heavily mined Korean Demilitarized Zone, believed to contain tens of thousands to millions of mines. A previous deployment of MRAP mine-resistant vehicles to Korea caused North Korea to accuse their presence as vehicles that would cross the DMZ for an attack of the country; the MRAPs were later withdrawn due to their unsuitability for the terrain. North Korea has not publicly responded to the ABVs’ arrival on the peninsula.

In April 2021 the US Department of State approved the sale of 29 M1150s to Australia, where they will be operated by the Australian Army.

See also
 Military engineering vehicles
 Combat engineering
 Trojan Armoured Vehicle Royal Engineers - similar British engineering vehicle

References

External links

Video from Deadliest Tech

Armored fighting vehicles of the United States
Tracked military vehicles
Military vehicles introduced in the 2000s